Softly is a studio album by American country singer–songwriter Hank Locklin. It was released in December 1968 via RCA Victor Records and contained 11 tracks. The album was co-produced by Chet Atkins and Danny Davis. Softly was Locklin's nineteenth studio album released in his career and third to be released in 1968. It contained one single, "Where the Blue of the Night Meets the Gold of the Day." The song became a charting single in 1969. The album itself would also reach a charting position following its original release.

Background and content
Hank Locklin had several years of limited commercial success during the mid 1960s. In 1968 however, his single titled "The Country Hall of Fame," reached the top ten of the American country charts. This brought a commercial resurgence to his career. His recent success prompted RCA Victor to release additional studio material of Locklin's, including Softly. The album was recorded in November 1968 at the RCA Victor Studio, located in Nashville, Tennessee. The sessions were co-produced by Chet Atkins and Danny Davis. It was Locklin's second studio effort to be co-produced by both men. Softly consisted of 11 tracks. Many of the record's tracks were new material. Also included was a cover of Merle Haggard's "Today I Started Loving You Again." "With One Exception" was originally a hit for country artist David Houston. The album's eventual lead single was also a cover of the hit, notably recorded by Bing Crosby.

Release and chart performance
Softly was released in December 1968 via RCA Victor Records. The record marked Locklin's nineteenth studio album release in his career. It was originally distributed as a vinyl LP, containing six songs on "side A" and five songs on "side B." In the 2010s, it was re-released in a digital format for music downloads and streaming. Softly spent six weeks on the Billboard Top Country Albums chart and peaked at number 32 in March 1969. It would be Locklin's final album to chart any Billboard list. One single was spawned from the album: "Where the Blue of the Night Meets the Gold of the Day." It was released on RCA Victor in January 1969. The single spent ten weeks on the Billboard Hot Country Songs chart and peaked at number 34 in March 1969. It was Locklin's final top 40 entry on the Billboard country songs chart.

Track listings

Vinyl version

Digital version

Personnel
All credits are adapted from the liner notes of Softly.

Musical and technical personnel
 Chet Atkins – producer
 Danny Davis – producer
 Hank Locklin – lead vocals
 Bill McElhiney – arrangement

Chart performance

Release history

References

1968 albums
Albums produced by Chet Atkins
Albums produced by Danny Davis (country musician)
Hank Locklin albums
RCA Victor albums